Sphegina sublatifrons is a species of hoverfly in the family Syrphidae.

Distribution
Serbia.

References

Eristalinae
Insects described in 1990
Diptera of Europe